Stigmine refers to a class of acetylcholinesterase inhibitors.

Examples include:

 Distigmine
 Neostigmine
 Physostigmine
 Pyridostigmine
 Rivastigmine

Acetylcholinesterase inhibitors